Juanita Rice Marbrook Guccione (née Anita Rice; 1904–1999) was an American painter, and taxidermist. 

During the 1930s she changed her name from Anita to Nita, and then later to Juanita Rice. She had used her partners last name Mabrouk, but later Americanized his name to Marbrook, and lastly she remarried in 1943 and used the surname Guccione.

Biography 
Anita Rice was her name at birth, she was born on June 20, 1904 in Chelsea, Massachusetts. Rice was the second oldest, and had three siblings including Irene Rice Pereira. She was raised in Pittsfield, Great Barrington, and Brooklyn. When she was young, she worked as a fashion model in New York City. 

She studied at Pratt Institute, followed by study at the Art Students League of New York, and later with Hans Hofmann from the mid-1930s to 1944. During the early 1930s she lived among the Ouled Naïl people in eastern Algeria, where she met Ben Aissa Mabrouk. Together with Ben Aissa Mabrouk, they had a child, Djelloul Marbrook born in 1934.

She was married to Dominick J. Guccione in 1943, a noted Woodstock taxidermist and that marriage ended with his death in 1959. After his death, she took over his taxidermy business, and moved to New York City where she did a lot of taxidermy-based interior decor such as animal skin rugs.

Guccione had held solo art exhibitions of her paintings in New York City, Woodstock, Washington D.C., Paris, Algeria and in India. In 1946 and 1947, her work was part of the Carnegie Prize exhibitions, Painting in the United States. In 2019, her work was in a postmortem exhibition, Juanita Guccione: Otherwhere at the Napa Valley Museum in Yountville.

Exhibitions 
 2019: Juanita Guccione: Otherwhere, Napa Valley Museum, Yountville, California
2007: For the People: American Mural Drawings of the 1930s and 1940s, Frances Lehman Loeb Art Center, Vassar College, Poughkeepsie, New York
 2001: Manhattan Sisters: I. Rice Pereira, Juanita Guccione, Fletcher Gallery, Woodstock, New York
1975: Juanita Guccione: Surrealist Paintings, Zarre Gallery, New York City, New York
1946: Painting in the United States, Carnegie Prize, New York City, New York
1947: Painting in the United States, Carnegie Prize, New York City, New York

References

Further reading 
 Morgan, Tabitha Adams, "A 'Living Art': Working-Class, Transcultural, and Feminist Aesthetics in the United States, Mexico, and Algeria, 1930s" (2012). Open Access Dissertations. 590. https://scholarworks.umass.edu/open_access_dissertations/590

External links 
 
Juanita Marbrook Guccione papers, 1949-1973, Archives of American Art, Smithsonian Institution
Marbrook, Juanita, 1948-1972, University of West Georgia Special Collections

1904 births
1999 deaths
Pratt Institute alumni
Art Students League of New York alumni
Taxidermists
20th-century women artists
American women painters
Cubist artists
American surrealist artists
Women surrealist artists
People from Chelsea, Massachusetts